The Ideal Exhibition with Hervé Tullet is a call to creation launched by the artist and author of youth book Hervé Tullet. The project consists of video workshops in the form of a web series and a sharing device in the form of a collective virtual exhibition.

The artistic project 
The project "The Ideal Exhibition with Hervé Tullet" proposes to everyone to realize his exhibition by following the gestures and pieces easy to realize of the artist and illustrator Hervé Tullet.

Result of a performance at the Livart Art Gallery in Montreal, in which Hervé Tullet holed, tore, folded, turned and assembled pieces, the first Ideal Exhibition was set up. This exhibition, composed of the creations made during the art residency, inaugurates the movement of The Ideal Exhibition, which invites everyone to create their own pieces.

In parallel with this movement of collective creation, a web series drawn from the performance of Hervé Tullet offers video workshops and interviews with the artist so that everyone can draw inspiration from them and explore new playgrounds.

Participant creations shared with the #expoideale hashtag are then aggregated and visible to everyone on the digital mosaic of the project's website.

The webseries 
The webseries part of the project consists of 22 episodes of creation, recreation and inspiration as well as 8 workshops to be followed alone or in groups. Each video is a laboratory of experimentation so that everyone can realize its ideal Expo.

The artist Hervé Tullet is the conductor of the project. He transmits to the public his creative techniques using colors, papers, brushes, scissors and other materials conducive to the visual arts.

The episodes 

 What is the ideal exhibition with Hervé Tullet?
 How to make an ideal Expo?
 Recreation: the dice game
 Recreation: the sumo game
 Recreation: bottling
 Recreation: flowers
 Recreation: sounds and music
 Creation: Scotch
 Creation: the lines
 Creation: the spots
 Creation: the holes
 Creation: small windows
 Creation: the collection of papers
 Creation: large windows
 Creation: paths
 Creation: totems
 Creation: the mosaic
 Creation: the mobile
 Creation: crumpled spots
 Creation: folded spots
 Creation: the wall
 How are ideas born?

Group workshops 

 Group workshop: reading
 Group workshop: flowers
 Group Workshop: sound # 1
 Group Workshop: sound # 2
 Group Workshop: Sound # 3
 Group Workshop: Sound # 4
 Group Workshop: Sound # 5
 Group Workshop: Sound # 6

Technical sheet 
 Title: The ideal exhibition with Hervé Tullet
 Animated and co-created by: Hervé Tullet
 Director: Vali Fugulin
 Producers: Florence Roche and Solen Labrie Trépanier
 Photo Director: Étienne Roussy
 Cameraman: Antoine Turcotte
 Soundman: Carl-André Hernandez
 Artistic director of stage, accessories: Josie-Anne Lemieux
 Assistant props: Josianne Desrochers
 Stage assistant: Frédérik Labrie Trépanier
 Director of Production and Post-Production: Solen Labrie Trépanier
 Editor: Marie-Elaine Chénier
 Editing assistant: Post-Modern
 Artistic director post production: Mathieu Lampron
 Graphic designers: Martin Durand and Francis Lizotte-Bédard
 Music Designer: XS MUSIC
 Communications and Marketing Strategist: Gaëlle Saules
 Animation of social networks: Laure Neria
 Website: Virginie Lesiège, Raphael-Moon Duquet-Cormier, Marie-Claude Poulin, Yanick Legault, Assya Nikolova, Patrick Coulombe
 Translator: Jennifer Mierau
 A production: Tobo Studio

With the financial participation of Bell Fund, Bayam and Bayard Youth.

References

External links 
 Bell Funds
 Bayam
 Montréal Book Fair 2018
 Studio TOBO
 IMDb
 

Contemporary art exhibitions
Canadian non-fiction web series